, is a Japanese arcade game by Takara Tomy and the successor of the Pretty Rhythm series of arcade games and the second entry in the Pretty Series. An anime television series adaptation by Tatsunoko Production and DongWoo A&E aired from July 5, 2014, to March 28, 2017. A second animation adaption, Idol Time PriPara, premiered on April 4, 2017 and an upcoming mobile game, Idol Land PriPara was set to be released in spring 2021 but has been delayed to fall 2022.

Anime-series plot

Season one
Every girl finds a mysterious PriTicket which grants them entrance to the world of PriPara, where aspiring, up-and-coming idols perform to pass an audition. At the Paprika Private Academy, PriPara activity is prohibited for elementary-school students. Fifth-grader Laala Manaka finds a lost PriTicket bag belonging to an idol, Mirei Minami, leading her to PriPara, a virtual world where people transform into their idol alter ego. There, she makes her idol debut with Mirei.

Laala forms SoLaMi Smile, a 3-person idol unit, with Mirei and Sophy Hojo (an idol with a weak body who relies on pickled plums for energy). This unit is managed by Kuma, a bear-like character who was formerly Mirei's manager. Eventually,  Sion Todo (a world-renowned Go player) and Canadian-Japanese twins Dorothy and Reona West, form Dressing Pafe, a rival idol unit managed by Sophie's former manager Usagi. Both units had the goal of earning the Paradise Coord.

Later on in the season, Laala encounters Falulu, a robotic vocal doll born from the desire by many girls to go to PriPara. SoLaMi Dressing competes against Falulu for the Paradise Coord in several idol competitions. SoLaMi Dressing wins and Laala exchanges PriTickets with Falulu, who falls into a coma. After performing a concert in their Paradise Coords, SoLaMi Dressing revives Falulu, who becomes more emotional, expressive and humanlike. Falulu goes to PriPari in France, and SoLaMi Dressing disbands back into SoLaMi Smile and Dressing Pafe.

Season two
In the PriPara amusement park, a Dream Theater has opened and the PriPara Dream Parade is held. The idols compete in the four seasonal Dream Idol Grand Prix in five-person teams for a Dream Parade Coord. While reforming SoLaMi Smile and Dressing Pafé, the six idols encounter Aromageddon, an angel-devil idol duo consisting of Mikan Shiratama and Aroma Kurosu. After some tension, they become friends.

Another girl, Fuwari Midorikaze, is sent to Parajuku from The Palps in EuroPara by the mysterious Hibiki Shikyoin to join PriPara. Fuwari forms Dressing Flower, a team with Laala and Dressing Pafe, and wins the Summer Dream Idol Grand Prix; however, their Summer Dream Idol Coords are taken away by the Masked Genius.

Ajimi Kiki, from EuroPara, debuts in PriPara but she is later revealed as Paprika Academy's art teacher. She and Cosmo form a dream team with the PriPara Police (Laala, Dorothy, and Mikan) and win the Autumn Dream Idol Grand Prix, but their Autumn Dream Idol Coords are taken by the Masked Genius.

During the Winter Dream Idol Grand Prix held, the Masked Genius is revealed to be Hibiki Shikyoin, who gives a concert, becomes a rival to Meganii Akai and reveals herself as a female. She enforces a law that only certain idols can perform, and the other girls form an underground PriPara in an old theater. A spoiled, mischievous vocal doll, Gaaruru joins Aromageddon, which is renamed Gaarmageddon. The FriendAll team (Laala, Dorothy, Mirei, Mikan, and Aroma) win the Spring Dream Idol Grand Prix and restore PriPara, and Hibiki, Fuwari and Falulu return.

Season three
The Divine Idol Grand Prix is held, and each idol receives a jewel which upgrades their microphones. During the contest, Meganii realizes that the Goddess, Jewlie, who is the special judge of the Divine Idol Grand Prix, was gone missing. After giving a tour to newcomers Chili Tsukigawa and Pepper Taiyo, Laala finds a mysterious baby named Jewlulu who thinks she is her mother. Laala raises Jewlulu and her younger sister, Non.

As the contest continued, Laala encountered Triangle (Junon, Pinon, and Kanon), a new virtual idol group managed by Usagi's sister Usacha, performs well. Laala shows Jewlulu to her friends, and Meganii says that the baby is actually was Jewlie. A number of other Grand Prix are held, Laala and her friends ready to prepared themselves to become a Divine Idol before Jewlie's twin sister, Janis, who wants to take over the Grand Prix.

Media

Arcade game
PriPara is a rhythm game which was developed by Syn Sophia. A player can create a character and progress by performing live shows.

PriPara: All Idol Perfect Stage! 
PriPara: All Idol Perfect Stage! is a rhythm video game developed by Syn Sophia for the Nintendo Switch. It was released on March 22, 2018. Players create a custom character to dance to songs from the PriPara anime as well as to songs exclusive to the game. Gameplay consists of timing button presses to on-screen prompts. The game also includes a harder difficulty called Gold Mode to add additional green and blue prompts that utilize different buttons. By performing well in the rhythm sections of the game, currency is gained that players can spend to customize their avatar with additional accessories and outfits. The game contains a Story Mode and Free Play Mode. Story Mode briefly summarizes the first three seasons of the anime and also tells an original story focusing on the player character. Free Play Mode lets the player choose either one of the characters from the anime or a custom character to dance to one of the game's songs. A custom character can have two characters from the show as background dances if they posses a necessary "Friend Ticket".

Anime series and films

An anime television-series adaptation by Tatsunoko and DongWoo A&E aired on TV Tokyo and other TXN stations from July 5, 2014 to March 28, 2017. It was succeeded by Idol Time Pripara on April 4, 2017. In spring 2015, the series could also be seen on three JAITS stations in Nara (TVN), Shiga (BBC) and Wakayama (WTV). During the first season's second story arc, the series began airing on FNN affiliate Sendai Television. On July 5, 2015, PriPara began airing on ANN affiliate SATV. In 2015, the animation for one of the endings was changed after the Broadcasting Ethics and Program Improvement Organization lodged a complaint for depicting the characters in swimsuits. While the images of the characters in swimsuits were not changed, the ending was edited to remove an image of Sophy Hojo wearing black lingerie.

An animated theatrical film, PriPara the Movie: Everyone, Assemble! Prism Tours, was released in March 2015. A second film (Fly Out, PriPara: Aim for it with Everyone! Idol☆Grand Prix) was released on October 24 of that year, and a third film (PriPara: Everyone's Yearning Let's Go☆PriPari) was released on March 12, 2016. An English-dubbed pilot was produced by William Winckler Productions in 2017.

Manga
A manga adaptation by Hitsuji Tsujinaga began serialization in Shogakukan's shōjo manga magazine Ciao in July 2014.

References

External links
Takara Tomy site 
TV Tokyo site 

2014 anime television series debuts
 
Anime television series based on video games
Arcade video games
Arcade-only video games
Japanese children's animated comedy television series
Japanese idols in anime and manga
Manga based on video games
Music in anime and manga
Shogakukan manga
Shōjo manga
Syn Sophia games
Takara Tomy franchises
Tatsunoko Production
TV Tokyo original programming
Video games developed in Japan